List of British middleweight boxing champions is a table showing the boxers who have won the British middleweight title. The title has been sanctioned by the National Sporting Club since 1909, and later by its replacement the British Boxing Board of Control (BBBoC) since 1929.

A champion may retire or voluntarily relinquish the title in order to fight for a higher-ranked championship. Where the date on which a champion relinquished the title is unclear, the date of the last BBBoC sanctioned fight is shown.

r–Champion relinquished title.

s–Champion stripped of title.

See also
 List of British heavyweight boxing champions
 List of British cruiserweight boxing champions
 List of British light-heavyweight boxing champions
 List of British super-middleweight boxing champions
 List of British light-middleweight boxing champions
 List of British welterweight boxing champions
 List of British light-welterweight boxing champions
 List of British lightweight boxing champions
 List of British super-featherweight boxing champions
 List of British featherweight boxing champions
 List of British super-bantamweight boxing champions
 List of British bantamweight boxing champions
 List of British super-flyweight boxing champions
 List of British flyweight boxing champions
 List of British world boxing champions

Sources
boxrec

Middle